Jean-Romain Delaloye (born 3 June 1981) is a Swiss diver. He competed at the 2000 Summer Olympics and the 2004 Summer Olympics.

References

1981 births
Living people
Swiss male divers
Olympic divers of Switzerland
Divers at the 2000 Summer Olympics
Divers at the 2004 Summer Olympics
Place of birth missing (living people)
21st-century Swiss people